Abhi Bhattacharya (20 November 1921 – 11 August 1993) was an Indian actor of Hindi and Bengali cinema, who is most remembered for his roles in films of the 1950s and the 1960s, such as Yatrik (1952), Jagriti (1954), Anuradha (1960) and Subarnarekha (1965). In his four decade long acting career he performed in more than 150 films in Hindi and 21 in Bengali. Abhi Bhattacharya worked with eminent film directors of India such as Ritwik Ghatak, Guru Dutt, Bimal Roy and Satyen Bose.

Early life 
Abhi was born in a village close to Rajshahi town of undivided Bengal (now in Bangladesh). He lost his mother at the age of seven. After his father remarried, young Abhi was sent to Gaya (India) to live with his maternal uncle and spent his formative years. He did well in school and sports. His aunt inculcated in him the love for drama, music and poetry, particularly those of Rabindranath Tagore. Gradually he developed a passion for films. After graduation, he started working at an American air base.

Film career 
His film career started when Hiten Chaudhuri asked him to come to Bombay for film related work. While in Bombay he applied for the screen test in response to an advertisement of Bombay Talkies and was selected in the role of hero in "Noukadubi", a film based on a novel by Tagore, directed by Nitin Bose 

Bhattacharya subsequently shifted to Calcutta when Birendranath Sircar of New Theatres invited him to act in the double version film Mahaprasthaner Pathey (1952) (Bengali) / Yatrik Hindi (1952). Around the same time he acted in the film Ratnadeep (1951) (Hindi), directed by Debaki Bose. Tamil version of the film, Ratna Deepam was released subsequently. In 1950s and in 1960s, Abhi Bhattacharya was quite sought after by the directors and producers of the Bombay film industry and he played opposite heroines like Madhubala, Mala Sinha, Geeta Bali, Madhabi Mukherjee. His other memorable films included Biraj Bahu (1954) by Bimal Roy, Jagriti (1954) and Parichay (1954) by Satyen Bose, Naata (1955) by D.N.Madhok, Sailaab (1956) by Guru Dutt, Apradhi Kaun (1957) by Asit Sen, Subarnarekha (film) (1965) in Bangla by Ritwik Ghatak, Netaji Subhas Chandra Bose (1966) by Hemen Gupta. He won Filmfare award (1956) for his role as the Best Supporting actor in the film Jagriti.

Religious activism 
Later in life, around 1971, he gradually began to focus more on spirituality through his association with Dadaji (whose name as a householder was Shri Amiya Roy Chowdhury). Bhattacharya became Dadaji's companion and helped spread his teachings. For about last two decades of his life, whenever Dadaji came to Bombay, Bhattacharya's house at Carter road acted as a rallying point for distinguished people from different walks of life who wanted to meet Dadaji. Abhi Bhattacharya wrote a book, narrating his realisations from experiences with Dadaji, titled Destiny with Dadaji. The book was edited by Ann Mills, who made it public online.

Filmography

 Noukadubi (1947)
 Yatrik (1952)
 Biraj Bahu (1954)
 Ratna Deepam (1953)
 Jagriti (1954)
Naata (1955)
 Sailaab (1956) 
 Apradhi Kaun? (1957)
 Anuradha (1960)
 Meghe Dhaka Tara (1960)
 Shola Aur Shabnam (1961)
 Dosti (1964) as Headmaster
 Subarnarekha (1965)
 Mahabharat (1965)
 Kranthiveera Sangolli Rayanna (1966)
 Netaji Subhash Chandra Bose (1966)
 Naunihal (1967)
 Jab Yaad Kisi Ki Aati Hai  (1967)
 [[Dharti Kahe Pukar Ke (1969 film)|Dharti Kahe Pukar Ke]] (1969)
 Aradhana (1969)
 Seema (1971)
 Sansar (1971)
 Amar Prem (1972)
 Seeta Aur Geeta (1972)
 Samadhi (1972)Mera Desh Mera Dharam (1973)
 Bhagat Dhanna Jatt (1974)
 Dost (1974)
 Imtihan (1974)
 Amanush (1975)
 Pratigya (1975)
 Do Anjaane (1976)
 Phool aur Insaan (1976)Solah Shukrawar (1977)... Acharya
 Mera Rakshak (1978)
 Dhuan (1981)
 Barsaat Ki Ek Raat (1981)
 Commander (1981)
 Hari Darshan (1982) – Lord Vishnu in various avatars
 Jamuna Kinare (1984) – Pandit Baijnath
 Harishchandra Shaibya (1985)
 Woh Din Aayega (1987) as Thakur
 Khooni Darinda (1987) – Jagatguru Sankaracharya, Jailor
 Daku Hasina (1987) – Village School Master
 Khudgarz (1987) - Minister (Special Appearance)
 Sadak Chhap (1987) - Police Commissioner (Special Appearance)
 Hamara Khandaan (1988) - Doctor (Special Appearance)
 Aakhri Badla (1989) - Dr Sen, Scientist
 Kisse Miya Biwi Ke in Ep 13 Hindi Tv Comedy Serial as Priya Tendulkar father 

Awards
 1956: Filmfare Best Supporting Actor Award: Jagriti'' (1954)

References

External links
 
 Abhi Bhattacharya Filmography at Chakpak
 Abhi Bhattacharya Filmography
 Destiny with Dadaji, his written book on spiritual journey with Dadaji Amiya Roy Choudhary (PDF

1921 births
1993 deaths
Indian male film actors
Male actors in Hindi cinema
Male actors in Bengali cinema
University of Calcutta alumni
Filmfare Awards winners
20th-century Indian male actors